The penthouse principle, a term in syntax coined by John R. Ross in 1973, describes the fact that many syntactic phenomena treat matrix (or main) clauses differently from embedded (or subordinate) clauses:

The penthouse principle: The rules are different if you live in the penthouse.

The penthouse named in the principle is the top floor of a high-rise apartment building, and is a metaphor for the matrix clause in a multi-clause structure (which, when diagrammed in usual phrase marker notation, contains the highest clause node in the structure). Perhaps the best-known example of a penthouse principle effect is the distribution of subject-auxiliary inversion in constituent questions in English, which in many (but not all) varieties of English is restricted to matrix clauses:

(1) a. What can Sam do about it?
 b. I'll find out what Sam can do about it.

Compare:
(2) a. *What Sam can do about it?
 b. *I'll find out what can Sam do about it.

Other phenomena falling under the penthouse principle are V2-effects in the Germanic languages and the distribution of declarative markers, imperative morphology, and of various particles in a variety of languages.

Notes

References

 
 

Syntax
English grammar